The Barlatte is a short mountain river that flows through the Alpes-Maritimes department of southeastern France. Its source is in the Maritime Alps, and it flows into the river Var near Guillaumes.

References

Rivers of France
Rivers of Alpes-Maritimes
Rivers of Provence-Alpes-Côte d'Azur